Marc Murphy (born 19 July 1987) is a retired Australian rules footballer who played for the Carlton Football Club in the Australian Football League (AFL). He was recruited with the first overall selection in the 2005 AFL draft and served as the captain of Carlton from the 2013 season to 2018. He is the son of John Murphy.

Early life and junior career
Murphy attended Whitefriars College in Donvale. He played for Beverley Hills Junior Football Club and Doncaster Football Club, before playing TAC Cup football with the Oakleigh Chargers. He represented the victorious Vic Metro team at the 2005 AFL Under 18 Championships, winning the Larke Medal as the best player of the tournament.

As the son of John Murphy, a Hall-of-Famer and legend of the Fitzroy Football Club, Marc was eligible to be taken by the Brisbane Lions under the father-son rule. However he exercised his option to decline the offer and nominate for the 2005 AFL National draft as he didn't want to leave Melbourne. Carlton subsequently took him in the draft with the first overall draft pick, a priority pick.

AFL career

2006–2007: Beginnings
Murphy made his AFL debut in round 1 of the 2006 season against Melbourne at the Telstra Dome. 17 disposals, 11 kicks and 6 handballs – highlighted by his first career goal – earned him an NAB AFL Rising Star award nomination. Murphy impressed pundits in his first season, and he was an early favourite for the Rising Star award. However, he sustained a season-ending shoulder injury in round 13 against the Brisbane Lions, which effectively ended any chance he had of winning it. Despite playing only twelve full games, Murphy led Carlton in assists for the season. He won Carlton's Best First Year Player award, and was voted by his peers as the AFL Players Association's Best First Year Player.

Murphy was elevated to the eight-man leadership group for the 2007 season. In early 2007, he replicated his good form of 2006, amassing 30 disposals against eventual premiers Geelong in round 2. However, an injury to prime midfielder Nick Stevens after round 3 saw Murphy attract the opposition's best taggers in most games. While his form remained solid, he finished outside the top 10 in the club's John Nicholls Medal.

2008
Murphy added considerable bulk to his frame during the off-season, highlighted in many preseason news articles. He was removed from the leadership group, which was reduced to five players. Murphy benefitted significantly from the return of Nick Stevens and the recruitment of Chris Judd, as they attracted the strongest taggers, giving Murphy more freedom to run. He had breakout games against Port Adelaide in round 11 and against Hawthorn in round 22, picking up a season-high 36 disposals at 81% efficiency. He played his 50th game in round 15 against St Kilda. Murphy capped off a great 2008 season by coming second to Judd in the John Nicholls Medal, and recording 11 votes in the Brownlow Medal.

Murphy was selected for Australia in the 2008 International Rules Series against Ireland. He was one of Australia's best in the first test, kicking 4 overs to assist a late-game comeback by Australia which fell one point short. He scored a goal in the second test by unintentionally tapping the ball into the net from crowded contest.

2009
Murphy continued his form in the 2009 season, establishing himself as one of the elite midfielders in the AFL, and averaging 25.6 disposals per game. He became Carlton's most potent goal-scoring midfielder, setting himself a personal target of averaging a goal a game, and he achieved this with a total of 31 goals from his 23 matches. After becoming a damaging midfielder, he was selected in the All-Australian Squad of 40, but was not selected in the team, and polled 15 Brownlow Medal votes to finish equal 9th. He again finished second in the Best and Fairest award (John Nicholls Medal) behind his captain Chris Judd.

2010
Murphy played his 100th game in Round 21, 2010; in doing so, he, father John (246 games for Fitzroy, South Melbourne and North Melbourne), and grandfather Leo Murphy (132 games for Hawthorn) became the only father-son-grandson combination in league history to each play 100 games.

Murphy missed much of the 2010 pre-season due to hip surgery, and struggled through the first half of the year. However, his second half of the season was exemplary, polling best and fairest votes in every game after Round 14 and ultimately finishing third for the award.

2011
Murphy became one of the league's elite midfielders in 2011. He was named in the All-Australian team for the first time in his career, on the half-forward flank, and won his first John Nicholls Medal for best and fairest player at Carlton. He was also named as the AFL Coaches' Association Champion Player of the Year, and The Age Player of the Year.

2012
Murphy started the year as strong as he finished 2011, becoming the favourite for the Brownlow Medal before a heavy collision with Patrick Dangerfield in round 8 where he sustained a shoulder injury. He returned in round 16, and from round 17 to 21 was named as the acting captain in the absence of Chris Judd.

2013
Marc was announced Captain of the Carlton Football Club after superstar Chris Judd stepped down. He began leading well, averaging 22 disposals for the season.

2014
In 2014 Marc played a consistent season averaging 24 Disposals in 20 games. He finished second in the John Nicholls Medal.

2015
Marc celebrated his 200th game against the Hawthorn Football Club in round 17 2015. Although the blues were beaten convincingly, Marc had a match high 37 Disposals. Marc finished second in the Blues' Best and Fariest by a vote behind young gun Patrick Cripps.

2016
At the end of 2015, it was speculated that Murphy might lose the Carlton captaincy when new coach Brendon Bolton declared that the club was going through a "real reset" which included reviewing the leadership. However early in the 2016 preseason, Murphy was reappointed captain the club again for a 4th straight season. The 2016 campaign started well for Marc until he suffered a season-ending ankle injury against Geelong in round 10.

2017
Marc bounced back from an injury-filled year to produce one of his most impressive to date, averaging over 29 disposals for the second time in his career. He won his second John Nicholls Medal as Carlton's Best and Fairest. His experience and leadership played an extremely important role in the club's "reset" which is still in progress today.

 2018 
Even at the age of 30 and after a wooden spoon season, Murphy still expressed his commitment to the football club after signing a contract extension. Murphy had another injury hindered season, only being able to play in 13 games. He once again committed to the team, signing an extension until the end of the 2020 season, proving his loyalty to the club.

 2019 
Marc Murphy stepped down as captain after his injury plagued 2018 season, giving young leaders Sam Docherty and Patrick Cripps co-captaincy. Murphy still remains in the leadership group, though alongside Ed Curnow and Kade Simpson.

 2021 

Murphy announced his retirement which came after his 300th and last game against Port Adelaide.

 Personal life 
In September 2015, Murphy proposed to longtime girlfriend, model, actor and blogger Jessie Habermann.  They were married in December 2016. Their first child was born in 2018.

Since 2010, Murphy has been an ambassador for the MAD Foundation, a Melbourne not for profit helping disabled and disadvantaged young people.

Statistics
  Statistics are correct to end of round 22, 2021

|- style="background-color: #EAEAEA"
! scope="row" style="text-align:center" | 2006
|style="text-align:center;"|
| 3 || 13 || 8 || 4 || 148 || 86 || 234 || 73 || 27 || 0.6 || 0.3 || 11.4 || 6.6 || 18.0 || 5.6 || 2.1 || 2
|-
! scope="row" style="text-align:center" | 2007
|style="text-align:center;"|
| 3 || 22 || 10 || 17 || 264 || 130 || 394 || 91 || 64 || 0.5 || 0.8 || 12.0 || 5.9 || 17.9 || 4.1 || 2.9 || 0
|- style="background-color: #EAEAEA"
! scope="row" style="text-align:center" | 2008
|style="text-align:center;"|
| 3 || 22 || 14 || 11 || 335 || 207 || 542 || 137 || 58 || 0.6 || 0.5 || 15.2 || 9.4 || 24.6 || 6.2 || 2.6 || 11
|-
! scope="row" style="text-align:center" | 2009
|style="text-align:center;"|
| 3 || 23 || 31 || 17 || 286 || 302 || 588 || 107 || 89 || 1.3 || 0.7 || 12.4 || 13.1 || 25.6 || 4.7 || 3.9 || 15
|- style="background-color: #EAEAEA"
! scope="row" style="text-align:center" | 2010
|style="text-align:center;"|
| 3 || 22 || 19 || 11 || 278 || 282 || 560 || 90 || 100 || 0.9 || 0.5 || 12.6 || 12.8 || 25.5 || 4.1 || 4.5 || 5
|-
! scope="row" style="text-align:center" | 2011
|style="text-align:center;"|
| 3 || 24 || 22 || 13 || 391 || 308 || 699 || 108 || 108 || 0.9 || 0.5 || 16.3 || 12.8 || 29.1 || 4.5 || 4.5 || 19
|- style="background-color: #EAEAEA"
! scope="row" style="text-align:center" | 2012
|style="text-align:center;"|
| 3 || 16 || 11 || 10 || 236 || 184 || 420 || 69 || 63 || 0.7 || 0.6 || 14.8 || 11.5 || 26.3 || 4.3 || 3.9 || 11
|-
! scope="row" style="text-align:center" | 2013
|style="text-align:center;"|
| 3 || 23 || 18 || 7 || 284 || 228 || 512 || 87 || 79 || 0.8 || 0.3 || 12.3 || 9.9 || 22.3 || 3.8 || 3.4 || 10
|- style="background-color: #EAEAEA"
! scope="row" style="text-align:center" | 2014
|style="text-align:center;"|
| 3 || 20 || 10 || 9 || 275 || 207 || 482 || 75 || 99 || 0.5 || 0.5 || 13.8 || 10.4 || 24.1 || 3.8 || 5.0 || 9
|-
! scope="row" style="text-align:center" | 2015
|style="text-align:center;"|
| 3 || 19 || 7 || 6 || 291 || 219 || 510 || 79 || 65 || 0.4 || 0.3 || 15.3 || 11.5 || 26.8 || 4.2 || 3.4 || 12
|- style="background-color: #EAEAEA"
! scope="row" style="text-align:center" | 2016
|style="text-align:center;"|
| 3 || 10 || 7 || 3 || 114 || 91 || 205 || 38 || 30 || 0.7 || 0.3 || 11.4 || 9.1 || 20.5 || 3.8 || 3.0 || 1
|-
! scope="row" style="text-align:center" | 2017
|style="text-align:center;"|
| 3 || 22 || 11 || 9 || 360 || 296 || 656 || 127 || 86 || 0.5 || 0.4 || 16.4 || 13.5 || 29.8 || 5.8 || 3.9 || 9
|- style="background-color: #EAEAEA"
! scope="row" style="text-align:center" | 2018
|style="text-align:center;"|
| 3 || 13 || 5 || 4 || 184 || 154 || 338 || 52 || 52 || 0.4 || 0.3 || 14.2 || 11.9 || 26.0 || 4.8 || 4.0 || 2
|-
! scope="row" style="text-align:center" | 2019
|style="text-align:center;"|
| 3 || 19 || 12 || 3 || 279 || 204 || 483 || 88 || 65 || 0.6 || 0.2 || 14.7 || 10.7 || 25.4 || 4.6 || 3.4 || 6
|- style="background-color: #EAEAEA"
! scope="row" style="text-align:center" | 2020
|style="text-align:center;"|
| 3 || 17 || 4 || 7 || 178 || 135 || 313 || 63 || 37 || 0.2 || 0.4 || 10.5 || 7.9 || 18.4 || 3.7 || 2.2 || 2
|-
! scope="row" style="text-align:center" | 2021
|style="text-align:center;"|
| 3 || 15 || 8 || 4 || 115 || 76 || 191 || 47 || 24 || 0.5 || 0.3 || 7.7 || 5.1 || 12.7 || 3.1 || 1.6 || 0

|- class="sortbottom"
! colspan=3| Career
! 300
! 197
! 135
! 4018
! 3109
! 7127
! 1341
! 1046
! 0.7
! 0.5
! 13.4
! 10.4
! 23.8
! 4.5
! 3.5
! 112
|}

 Game highs 

 Honours and achievements Individual 2x John Nicholls Medal: 2011, 2017
 All-Australian team: 2011
 Australian representative honours in international rules football: 2008
 AFL Coaches' Association (AFLCA) Champion Player of the Year: 2011
 AFL Players Association (AFLPA) Best First Year Player: 2006
 AFL Rising Star nominee: 2006
 Larke Medal': 2005

References

External links

 
 Marc Murphy's profile in Blueseum

1987 births
Living people
Carlton Football Club players
Australian rules footballers from Melbourne
Oakleigh Chargers players
All-Australians (AFL)
John Nicholls Medal winners
Australia international rules football team players